Do Ab-e Huran (also Romanized as Do Āb-e Hūrān; also known as Do Āb and Dow Āb) is a village in Mazu Rural District, Alvar-e Garmsiri District, Andimeshk County, Khuzestan Province, Iran. At the 2006 census, its population was 24, in 5 families.

References 

Populated places in Andimeshk County